Spanish composer Manuel de Falla's Concerto for Harpsichord, Flute, Oboe, Clarinet, Violin and Cello was written in 1923–26 for Wanda Landowska, who participated in its premiere.

History
Falla had met the dedicatee on several occasions in the early 1920s, and by the time she participated in the Paris premiere of Falla's El retablo de maese Pedro in June 1923, he had already decided to write a concerto for her. Although there was never a formal commission, composition began in October 1923 but work proceeded slowly. Landowska first planned to perform the work in the 1923–24 season. When Falla found it impossible to meet that deadline, Landowska discussed with Leopold Stokowski a performance as part of the Philadelphia Orchestra's 1924–25 season, but again Falla could not finish the work in time. The premiere finally took place in Barcelona on 5 November 1926, with further performances in New York and Boston.

The Concerto was the last lengthy work Falla completed. Although there are several subsequent pieces in his catalogue that are important for their content, none of them lasts more than ten minutes, and his final, monumental project, the opera-oratorio Atlántida, on which he worked for twenty years, remained unfinished at his death.

It is commonly regarded as a model example of both mysticism (of a sort originating in Spanish religious tradition) and a severe and ascetic form of neoclassicism (as opposed to the "frivolous" neoclassicism of Igor Stravinsky).

Analysis
The work is in three movements:

An abundance of surviving documents facilitates an understanding of both the slow, meticulous creative evolution and also the structure of the work. On the one hand, there is the extensive correspondence between Wanda Landowska and Falla from the period 1922 to 1930, and on the other hand numerous sketches, drafts, and intermediate stages of the score that are preserved in the Manuel de Falla Archive and the Archive Valentín Ruiz-Aznar, both located in Granada.

The second movement is inscribed at the end "A. Do. MCMXXVI—In festo Corporis Christi", though the composer said the date was "a matter of pure chance".

References

Sources

Further reading

 Christoforidis, Michael. 1997a. "Aspects of the Creative Process in Manuel de Falla's El retablo de maese pedro and Concerto", 2 vols. PhD diss. Melbourne: University of Melbourne.
 Christoforidis, Michael. 1997b. "El peso de la vanguardia en el proceso creativo del Concerto de Manuel de Falla". Revista de Musicología 20, no. 1, Actas del IV Congreso de la Sociedad Espanolade Musicoligía: La investigación musical en España: Estado de la cuestión y aportaciones I (January–December): 669–682.
 Collins, Chris. 2013. "Principios rotacionales y forma teleológica en el Concerto de Falla". Quodlibet: Revista de especialización musical, no. 53 (May–August): 26-44.
 Harper, Nancy Lee. 2005. Manuel de Falla: His Life and Music. Lanham: Scarecrow Press.  (cloth); .
 Hoffelé, Jean-Christophe. 1992. Manuel de Falla. Paris: Fayard.
 Kassel, Matthias. 1996. "Manuel de Falla: Concerto for Harpsichord (or Piano) and Flute, Oboe, Clarinet, Violin and Violoncello, 1923–26". Basel: Paul Sacher Stiftung. .
 Lassus, Marie-Pierre. 1999. "Ombre et lumière dans le Concerto". In Manuel de Falla: Latinité et universalité, edited by Louis Jambou, 251–260. Musiques/Écritures: Série études. Paris: Presses de l'Université de Paris-Sorbonne. .
 Mayer-Serra, Otto. 1943. "Falla's Musical Nationalism". The Musical Quarterly 29, no. 1 (January): 1–17.
 Nommick, Yvan. 1998b. "Manuel de Falla: œuvre et évolution du langage musical". PhD thesis. Paris: Université de Paris-Sorbonne.
 Piquer Sanclemente, Ruth. 2013. "Influencias del cubismo en la configuración de la vanguardia musical española: Concerto de Manuel de Falla (1923–1926)". In Musicología global, musicología local, edited by Javier Marín López, Germán Gan Quesada, Elena Torres Clemente, and Pilar Ramos López, 21–38. Madrid: Sociedad Española de Musicología. ; 84-86878-31-4.
 Pizà, Antoni. 1996. "Els escrits de Joan Maria Thomàs per The Chesterian". In III Simpòsium sobre els orgues històrics de Mallorca; III Trobada de documentalistes musicals; III Jornades musicals Capvuitada de Pasqua, preface by Miquel Ferrer i Viver, 59–84. Estudis musicals 3. Búger, Spain: Fundació Àrea Creació Acústica (Centre de Recerca i Documentació Històrico-Musical de Mallorca).
 Rapado Jambrina, Elisa. 2001. "El concierto de Manuel de Falla". Filomusica: Revista de música culta, no. 20 (September).
 Rigoni, Michel. 1990. "De Falla: Concerto pour clavecin". Analyse musicale, no. 21 (November): 55–64.
 Rigoni, Michel. 1992. "Manuel de Falla: Concerto pour clavecin". Analyse musicale, no. 26 (February): 55–57.
 Russomanno, Stefano. 2000. "La música ante la historia: Dinámicas del tiempo en el Concerto de Falla y en la Sonata da camera de Petrassi". In Manuel de Falla e Italia: Estudios, edited by Yvan Nommick, 124–143. Colección estudios: Serie música, No. 3. Granada, Spain: Fundación Archivo Manuel de Falla. .
 Vinay, Gianfranco. 1989. "La lezione di Scarlatti e di Stravinsky nel Concerto per clavicembalo di Falla". In Manuel de Falla tra la Spagna e l'Europa: Atti del Convegno Internazionale di Studi (Venezia, 15-17 maggio 1987), edited by Paolo Pinamonti, 179–188. Quaderni della Rivista italiana di musicologia, No. 21. Florence: Leo S. Olschki. .
 Walsh, Craig T. 1998. "Multiple Perspectives on Form in the First Movement of Manuel de Falla's Concerto for Harpsichord, Flute, Oboe, Clarinet, Violin, and Violincello  (and) Pipeline Burst Cache for Cello and Tape (Original Composition)". PhD diss. Waltham: Brandeis University.

External links
 
 
 , played by Manuel de Falla

Compositions by Manuel de Falla
Falla
1926 compositions
Music dedicated to ensembles or performers